Yakub, Yakiv Holovatsky (17 October 1814 in Chepeli, Kingdom of Galicia and Lodomeria, Austrian Empire — 13 May 1888 in Vilno, Russian Empire) was a noted Galician historian, literary scholar, ethnographer, linguist, bibliographer, lexicographer, poet and leader of Galician Russophiles. He was a member of the Ruthenian Triad, one of the most influential Ukrainian literary groups in the Austrian Empire.

Biography
Yakov was born in a family of a priest Fedir Holovatsky (Hlavatsky) whose heritage takes roots in the city of Mykolaiv (today in Lviv Oblast). Ivan Holovatsky, grandfather of Yakiv, was szlachtycz of Polish Prus coat of arms family and the burg-minister of Mykolaiv. Yakiv's mother Fekla Yakymovych also was from the family of a priest in Tur, Zloczow powiat. His education he received in Lviv where later he enrolled into the Theological Seminary of the University of Lviv. As a student he traversed Galicia, Bukovina, and Transcarpathia collecting folk songs. In 1832, at Lviv University he, Markiyan Shashkevych, and Ivan Vahylevych formed the Ruthenian Triad, which published the first Halycz almanac in the vernacular, Rusalka Dnistrovaya (The Dniester Nymph, 1836), and played an important role in the Galician cultural revival. In 1842 he became a Greek Catholic priest and later received an appointment to the village of Mykytyntsi near Kolomyia. From 1848 to 1867 he was the first professor of Ukrainian philology at Lviv University. During that time in 1864-1866 was the rector (rector magnificus) of the university. Influenced by Mikhail Pogodin's Pan-Slavist ideas, he became a Russophile in the 1850s. Dismissed from the university for his views, in 1867 he moved to Russian-ruled Vilno to head the archeological commission there.

References

1814 births
1888 deaths
Ruthenian nobility
Russophiles of Galicia
Linguists from Ukraine
Ukrainian male poets
Ukrainian ethnographers
Literary scholars
People from the Kingdom of Galicia and Lodomeria
Ukrainian Austro-Hungarians
Austro-Hungarian emigrants to the Russian Empire
Converts to Eastern Orthodoxy from Catholicism
Ukrainian priests
Academic staff of the University of Lviv
University of Lviv alumni
Kosice Academy alumni
Budapest University alumni
University of Lviv rectors
Lviv Seminary alumni
19th-century poets
Ukrainian writers in Polish